Mackenzie Blackburn (Chinese name:呂明龍, born November 10, 1992) is a Canadian-born Chinese Taipei short track speed skater who has competed for the latter since 2008. Blackburn has also qualified to compete for Chinese Taipei at the 2014 Winter Olympics in Sochi, Russia. By doing so he became the first athlete to qualify from Taiwan in short track speed skating.

Although Blackburn was born in Canada, he is able to compete for Chinese Taipei because of his mother's birthplace.

Personal records

References

1992 births
Living people
Canadian people of Taiwanese descent
Taiwanese male short track speed skaters
Olympic short track speed skaters of Taiwan
Short track speed skaters at the 2014 Winter Olympics